was a Japanese former swimmer who competed in the 1964 Summer Olympics.

References

1943 births
1998 deaths
Japanese male medley swimmers
Japanese male backstroke swimmers
Olympic swimmers of Japan
Swimmers at the 1964 Summer Olympics
Asian Games medalists in swimming
Swimmers at the 1966 Asian Games
Asian Games gold medalists for Japan
Medalists at the 1966 Asian Games
Universiade medalists in swimming
Universiade gold medalists for Japan
Universiade bronze medalists for Japan
Medalists at the 1961 Summer Universiade
Medalists at the 1967 Summer Universiade
20th-century Japanese people